Dyma'r Dystiolaeth is the debut album by the Welsh band Tystion, released on Fit! 001, cassette.

Track listing
 Y Bardd A'r Brawd
 Jeremeia
 (Rhaid Eu) Tynnu I Lawr
 Fitamin Cetamin
 Gair O'r Stryd
 Mewn Amser...
 Pump I Bedwar
 Cariadon Fori
 Jazzmental
 Mae'r Frwydr Yn Parhau

See also
Music of Wales

External links
  Fitamin Un Discography

Welsh-language albums
1995 debut albums
Tystion albums